Governor Jackson may refer to:

Andrew Jackson (1767–1845), 1st Territorial Governor of Florida
Charles Jackson (Rhode Island politician) (1797–1876), 18th Governor of Rhode Island
Claiborne Fox Jackson (1806–1862), 15th Governor of Missouri
Edward L. Jackson (1873–1954), 32nd Governor of Indiana
Elihu Emory Jackson (1837–1907), 41st Governor of Maryland
Frank D. Jackson (1854–1938), 15th Governor of Iowa
Frederick John Jackson (1859–1929), Governor of Uganda from 1911 to 1918
Hancock Lee Jackson (1796–1876), 13th Governor of Missouri
Henry Jackson (colonial administrator) (1849–1908), 31st Governor of the Leeward Islands
Jacob B. Jackson (1829–1893), 6th Governor of West Virginia
James Jackson (Georgia politician) (1757–1806), 23rd Governor of Georgia
Stanley Jackson (1870–1947), Governor of Bengal from 1927 to 1932
Wilfrid Edward Francis Jackson (1883–1971), Governor of Mauritius from 1930 to 1937, Governor of British Guiana from 1937 to 1941, and Governor of Tanganyika from 1941 to 1945
William Jackson (British Army officer) (1917–1999), Governor of Gibraltar from 1978 to 1982